Angel Gonzalez Zuluaga (born 3 October 1995) is an Argentine footballer who plays as a midfielder for Bylis in the Kategoria Superiore.

Career

Bylis
In January 2020, Gonzalez moved to Albanian Superliga club Bylis. He made his league debut for the club on 26 January 2020, starting in a 1-0 away defeat to Teuta Durrës.

References

External links

1995 births
Living people
KF Oriku players
KF Bylis Ballsh players
Erovnuli Liga 2 players
Kategoria e Parë players
Kategoria Superiore players
Argentine footballers
Association football midfielders
Argentine expatriate footballers